Philip Dougherty House is a historic home located in East Fallowfield Township, Chester County, Pennsylvania, United States. It is directly across the road from the Philip Dougherty Tavern.  It was built about 1774, and is a two-story, four bay, stuccoed stone dwelling with a gable roof.  It features a full width front porch with a hipped roof.  Also on the property are a contributing bank barn, machine shop, and milk house.  Philip Dougherty was the brother of Edward Dougherty, who built the Edward Dougherty House.

It was added to the National Register of Historic Places in 1985.

References

Houses on the National Register of Historic Places in Pennsylvania
Houses completed in 1774
Houses in Chester County, Pennsylvania
National Register of Historic Places in Chester County, Pennsylvania